Irina Deleanu (born November 12, 1975) is a former individual rhythmic gymnast from Romania.

Biography 
In the 1992 World Championships she won the bronze medal in rope. She retired from the sport in 1993. An annual Rhythmic Gymnastics competition held in Bucharest is named after her, The Irina Deleanu Cup. She is currently the president of the Romanian Rhythmic Gymnastics Federation.

Suspension 
The FIG initiated disciplinary proceedings against Irina Deleanu on March 12, 2012 at the request of the Cyprus Gymnastics Federation damaging the reputation of Cypriot gymnast Chrystalleni Trikomiti, following comments that she made during a television interview with regard to the judging at the Rhythmic Gymnastics qualifying event for London 2012, which took place in January 2012. Deleanu was suspended of her membership of the Technical Committee of the European Gymnastics Union from the date of the said decision until December 31, 2016, the length of the suspension was later reduced until the end of December 2015.

References

External links

Federatia Romana de Gimnastica Ritmica 

1975 births
Living people
Romanian rhythmic gymnasts
Olympic gymnasts of Romania
Gymnasts at the 1992 Summer Olympics
Medalists at the Rhythmic Gymnastics World Championships